Incana rope bridges are simple suspension bridges over  canyons , gorges and rivers (pongos) constructed by the Inca Empire.  The bridges were an integral part of the Inca road system and exemplify Inca innovation in engineering. Bridges of this type were useful since the Inca people did not use wheeled transport – traffic was limited to pedestrians and livestock – and they were frequently used by chasqui runners delivering messages throughout the Inca Empire.

Construction and maintenance 
The bridges were constructed using ichu grass woven into large bundles which were very strong.
Part of the bridge's strength and reliability came from the fact that each cable was replaced every year by local villagers as part of their mit'a public service or obligation. In some instances, these local peasants had the sole task of repairing these bridges so that the Inca highways or road systems could continue to function.  
Repairing these bridges was dangerous, with those performing repairs often facing death. 

In 1615, in Quechua author Huamán Poma's manuscript The First New Chronicle, Poma illustrates the Guambo rope bridge in use. He describes the masonry bridges as a positive result of the Spanish colonization of Peru, as the new bridges prevented deaths from the dangerous repair work.

Famous examples
The greatest bridges of this kind were in the Apurímac Canyon along the main road north from Cusco; a famous example spans a 45-meter gap that is supposed to be the inspiration behind Thornton Wilder's 1928 Pulitzer Prize winning novel The Bridge of San Luis Rey (1927).

Made of grass, the last remaining Inca rope bridge, reconstructed every June, is the Q'iswa Chaka (Quechua for "rope bridge"), spanning the Apurimac River near Huinchiri, in Canas Province, Quehue District, Peru. Even though there is a modern bridge nearby, the residents of the region keep the ancient tradition and skills alive by renewing the bridge annually in June. Several family groups have each prepared a number of grass-ropes to be formed into cables at the site; others prepare mats for decking, and the reconstruction is a communal effort. The builders have indicated that effort is performed to honor their ancestors and the Pachamama (Earth Mother).

See also

 Carrick-a-Rede Rope Bridge, a rope suspension bridge in Northern Ireland
 Inca Bridge, rope bridge, secret entrance to Machu Picchu
 Simple suspension bridge. see the image of the Inca rope bridge built with modern materials and structural refinements
 Suspension bridge, modern suspended-deck type

References

Bibliography

 Showed the bridge at Huinchiri and predicted the art of building it would be lost within another generation, which proved untrue.
 Describes the documentary film directed by Jorge Carmona.

External links

 
 
 
 
 

Inca

Inca
Ropework
Footbridges
Suspension bridges
Cultural heritage of Peru